Anthony Edward Bass (born November 1, 1987) is an American professional baseball pitcher for the Toronto Blue Jays of Major League Baseball (MLB). He has previously played in MLB for the San Diego Padres, Houston Astros, Texas Rangers, Chicago Cubs, Seattle Mariners, and Miami Marlins. Bass has also played for the Hokkaido Nippon-Ham Fighters of Nippon Professional Baseball (NPB). He played college baseball at Wayne State University.

Amateur career
Bass attended Trenton High School in Trenton, Michigan, and Wayne State University, where he played college baseball for the Wayne State Warriors. As a junior at Wayne State, Bass was named the 2008 Great Lakes Intercollegiate Athletic Conference Pitcher of the Year.  He was the highest MLB draft pick in Wayne State history.

Professional career

San Diego Padres
Bass was drafted by the San Diego Padres in the fifth round of the 2008 Major League Baseball Draft.  He worked as a starting pitcher for the Single-A Fort Wayne TinCaps and Advanced-A Lake Elsinore Storm in 2009, and again for Lake Elsinore in 2010.  He began 2011 with the Double-A San Antonio Missions, and although he made a single start for the Triple-A Tucson Padres in May, he was promoted to the big leagues from Double-A in June.

Bass made his major league debut on June 13, 2011, pitching a five-inning start and earning his first major league win. He struck out Seth Smith for his first Major League strikeout. He was optioned back to San Antonio the next day, but was recalled again in late June.  Bass stayed with the big league club for the remainder of the year, pitching out of the bullpen until making two more starts in late September.  He finished 2011 with a 1.68 ERA in 48 innings and 24 strike-outs versus 21 walks.

Bass started 2012 in the Padres bullpen, but was added to the starting rotation on April 12 when Dustin Moseley injured his shoulder. Bass made 14 starts for the club until he went on the disabled list in June with shoulder inflammation.  He rejoined the club in September, working out of the bullpen after making three rehab starts with Tucson.  Bass finished 2012 with a 2–8 record and a 4.73 ERA in 97 innings, with 80 strike-outs against 39 walks.

Houston Astros
On December 11, 2013, Bass, along with a player to be named later or cash considerations, was traded to the Houston Astros for a player to be named later or cash considerations. The Astros sent Patrick Schuster to the Padres the next day. Bass spent the 2014 season split between the Astros and the team's Class AAA affiliate, the Oklahoma City RedHawks. He appeared in 21 major league games and earned two saves. He was outrighted off the Astros roster on November 20, 2014. On December 6, Bass elected free agency.

Texas Rangers
Bass signed a minor league deal with the Texas Rangers on December 11, 2014. Bass split time between the AAA level and the Majors, used mainly as a reliever. In 33 games for the Rangers, he compiled a 4.50 ERA in 64 innings.

Hokkaido Nippon-Ham Fighters
After the 2015 season, the Rangers traded Bass and Leonys Martín to the Seattle Mariners for Tom Wilhelmsen, James Jones, and a player to be named later (Patrick Kivlehan). Bass was released by the Mariners on January 7, 2016, and signed with the Hokkaido Nippon-Ham Fighters on January 8.

March 30, 2016, Bass made his NPB debut. Bass earned three wins during the 2016 Japan Series to lead the Fighters to victory in the championship series, including the fourth win for the team to clinch the team's fifth championship.

Second stint with Rangers
Bass signed a minor league deal with the Texas Rangers in February 2017.

Chicago Cubs
On December 20, 2017, Bass signed a minor league contract with the Chicago Cubs.
Bass was called up to the majors by the Cubs on June 11, 2018, after compiling a 2.28 ERA across 23.2 innings with the Triple-A Iowa Cubs. Bass immediately saw action as he pitched the final inning of a 7-2 11 inning victory over the Milwaukee Brewers. He was outrighted to AAA on August 12, 2018, and elected free agency on October 11.

Cincinnati Reds
On December 30, 2018, Bass signed a minor league contract with the Cincinnati Reds. He was released on March 25, 2019. Bass re-signed to another minor league contract on March 28, 2019. He opened the 2019 season with the Louisville Bats. On May 21, he was released by the Reds after exercising an opt-out clause in his contract.

Seattle Mariners
On May 21, 2019, Bass signed a major league contract with the Seattle Mariners.

Toronto Blue Jays
On October 29, 2019, the Toronto Blue Jays claimed Bass off waivers from the Mariners. He signed a one-year contract worth $1.5 million with the team on December 3, 2019, in order to avoid arbitration.

On July 24, 2020, Bass made his Blue Jays debut. With the 2020 Toronto Blue Jays, Bass appeared in 26 games, compiling a 2–3 record with 3.51 ERA and 21 strikeouts in 25.2 innings pitched.

Miami Marlins
On January 22, 2021, Bass signed a 2-year, $5MM deal with the Miami Marlins that included a team option in 2023.  In April 2021, Bass was the pitcher during an extremely rare walk-off hit by pitch to lose a game against the New York Mets.  With the bases loaded and the score tied in the bottom of the ninth inning, batter Michael Conforto's elbow was grazed by Bass's pitch, albeit on a clear strike where camera footage seemed to show Conforto recklessly extending his elbow into the pitch.  The HBP call was controversial, with umpire Ron Kulpa saying after the game he felt his own call was in error after reviewing the footage, and Conforto should have been charged with a strike due to an insufficient attempt to avoid Bass's pitch.

Toronto Blue Jays (second stint)
Bass was traded back to the Toronto Blue Jays with Brampton native Zach Pop and a player to be named later for prospect Jordan Groshans on August 2, 2022.

Personal life
On August 1, 2016, Bass married Sydney Rae James, sister of country singer Jessie James and sister in-law of Eric Decker in a private ceremony. Their first daughter was born prematurely on September 4, 2017. They adopted another daughter in October 2020. Bass has a brother and two sisters. His parents are Ed and Linda Bass.

References

External links

1987 births
Living people
American expatriate baseball players in Japan
Baseball players from Michigan
Chicago Cubs players
Eugene Emeralds players
Fort Wayne TinCaps players
Hokkaido Nippon-Ham Fighters players
Houston Astros players
Iowa Cubs players
Lake Elsinore Storm players
Louisville Bats players
Major League Baseball pitchers
Miami Marlins players
Nippon Professional Baseball pitchers
Oklahoma City RedHawks players
People from Trenton, Michigan
Peoria Javelinas players
Portland Beavers players
Quad Cities River Bandits players
Round Rock Express players
San Antonio Missions players
San Diego Padres players
Seattle Mariners players
Texas Rangers players
Toronto Blue Jays players
Tucson Padres players
Wayne State Warriors baseball players